Jordanita notata is a moth of the family Zygaenidae. It is found from the Iberian Peninsula and central Europe, through the northern part of the Mediterranean region (including Sicily and Crete) to the Caucasus and Transcaucasia.

The length of the forewings is 11–16 mm for males and 7.5–10.5 mm for females. It is an extremely variable species. Individuals from southern Spain are large and bright green or golden green, while specimens from southern France are small. Individuals from the Turkish population are very large and dark in color and specimens from Crete are very small, green and transparent. Adults are on wing from the end of March in Spain and to the beginning of July in Central Europe. They feed on the flower nectar of various flowers, including Centaurea, Carduus and Knautia species.

The larvae feed on Centaurea jacea, Centaurea scabiosa and Cirsium species. They mine the leaves of their host plant. Young larva make a number of tiny corridor mines. Older larvae make a number of very sloppy fleck mines by working the front half their body under the lower epidermis of the leaf and then devouring most leaf tissue. The opening of the mine is a slit at the side. The larvae are very variable in color, but generally have a blackish-brown head and a greyish-brown body with a yellow-grey underside.

References

C. M. Naumann, W. G. Tremewan: The Western Palaearctic Zygaenidae. Apollo Books, Stenstrup 1999,

External links
Lepiforum e. V.

Procridinae
Moths of Europe
Moths of Asia
Moths described in 1847